Caridina glaubrechti is species of lacustrine fresh water shrimp endemic to western part of Lake Towuti on the Indonesian island of Sulawesi. It is named in honor of German Zoologist Matthias Glaubrecht.

Habitat and Ecology 
C. glaubrechti is mainly found in shallow regions where it dwells on rocks and hard substrate. It is syntopic with Caridina profundicola, Caridina spinata, Caridina striata, and Caridina woltereckae.

Threats 
Like many of the shrimp from the lakes of Sulawesi, C. glaubrechti faces a number of threats, including non-native predators, pollution, and the damning of waterways for hydroelectric power.

References 

Crustaceans described in 2009
Atyidae
Freshwater crustaceans of Asia
Crustaceans of Indonesia
Endemic fauna of Indonesia
Endemic freshwater shrimp of Sulawesi